Invaders from Mars is a 1986 American science fiction horror film, directed by Tobe Hooper from a screenplay by Dan O'Bannon and Don Jakoby. It is a remake of the 1953 film of the same name, and is a reworking of that film's screenplay by Richard Blake from an original story by John Tucker Battle. Its production was instigated by Wade Williams, millionaire exhibitor, science fiction film fan and sometime writer-producer-director, who had reissued the original film in 1978 after purchasing the copyright to the property. Elaborate creature and visual effects were supplied by Stan Winston and John Dykstra.

Plot 
George Gardner encourages his 12-year-old son David's dreams of becoming an astronaut by stargazing with him. A thunderstorm wakes David, and he observes a strange alien spaceship landing on Copper Hill, just beyond the house. His father agrees to investigate, but returns behaving strangely and with an unexplained mark on the back of his neck. David's mother Helen and others as well soon  become similarly changed from their normal selves, worrying David.

At school, David discovers that his teacher Mrs. McKeltch and classmate Heather have also been changed. David shares his fears with Nurse Linda Magnusson after seeing she has no neck mark. Linda is skeptical but begins to share David's concern after seeing the change in Mrs. McKeltch and his parents. After evading capture by Mrs. McKeltch, David follows her to a cave in Copper Hill and discovers that the alien ship is real, crewed by brutish drones and their large-brained leader who is controlling many people around the town via brain implants inserted through the neck. David flees and reveals what he has learned to Linda. The two of them investigate further and decide to seek outside help.

David and Linda meet with General Wilson, commander of the military base that employs David's father. The general begins to believe them when two alien abductees at the site are exposed, confronted, and die from the killswitches in their implants activating. Wilson meets with NASA and SETI scientists who insist on proceeding with a scheduled launch to Mars, but the rocket is destroyed by a bomb planted by George. The scientists conclude that the Martians interpreted the launch as an act of war and are invading Earth preemptively.

Wilson leads his troops against the alien encampment at Copper Hill. While they prepare for a raid, David and Linda are captured by the Martians, prompting Wilson to launch a rescue mission. After unsuccessfully pleading with the Martian leader, David escapes while an unconscious Linda is prepped for implantation. David leads Wilson's force to the control room where a short but intense battle occurs. Linda is rescued and the invaders are forced to initiate a retreat. The human survivors plant charges and flee the ship as its liftoff sequence begins. David runs for the safety of his home, pursued by his parents, still under alien control. As the rising alien ship explodes, David's parents recover and try to protect him as the massive fireball races toward them.

Suddenly, David awakens in his bedroom. His parents assure him that his ordeal was just a dream and leave him to continue sleeping. However, David soon sees the same alien ship appear. He runs to his parents' room and screams in horror at what he sees.

Cast 

Vietnam War veteran Dale Dye has a small role as the Squad Leader, future stunt coordinator Scott Leva plays a Marine Officer, and Joseph Anthony Cox appears in costume as a Drone.

Associations with other films 
Jimmy Hunt, who plays the Police Chief in the 1986 version, played David MacLean in the 1953 film (renamed David Gardner in this version). David is seen watching this film's director Tobe Hooper's previous film, 1985's Lifeforce, on television when his mother surprises him.

When the indoctrinated police officers are searching for David and Nurse Magnuson in the school's basement, they briefly shine a flashlight on some stored theatrical props, one of which is the Supreme Intelligence alien inside its clear orb as depicted in the original 1953 version. It is not known if this is the original prop or a replica made for the 1986 film. The Gardner's mailbox shows the name of the town as Santa Mira, an homage to the town where another sci-fi film, 1956's Invasion of the Body Snatchers, was set.

Filming locations 
The scenes shot on location at David's school were filmed at Eagle Rock Elementary School in the Eagle Rock neighborhood of Los Angeles, California. The school bore a temporary fake nameplate in the film that read "Menzies Elementary School" as a tribute to the 1953 film's director, William Cameron Menzies. The Gardners' home in the film is the same house that was purpose-built for the 1948 Cary Grant/Myrna Loy film, Mr. Blandings Builds His Dream House, and still stands as the administrative offices for park employees at Malibu Creek State Park. Other locations include Simi Valley, California.

Release

Box office 
Invaders from Mars was released on June 6, 1986, opening in seventh place. In total, it earned $4,884,663 at the US box office, a loss from its $7,000,000 budget.

Reception 
Nina Darnton wrote in The New York Times that Hooper "knows how to construct a horror film so it builds to a screaming pitch" and also praised the "excellent cast," but thought that when the Martians are finally revealed, "the film becomes less terrifying. We get lost in the complexities of the inventions and finally they seem overdone and overproduced." Variety panned the film as "an embarrassing combination of kitsch and boredom," adding that a remake of the 1953 original was a reasonable idea but "Dan O'Bannon and Don Jakoby's inferior screenplay fails to bring in new ideas or provide interesting dialog. The story elements here have been done to death in the interim." Sid Smith of the Chicago Tribune gave the film 3 stars out of 4 and wrote, "Much of what is lovable about Hooper's fun, scary and refreshingly silly movie is all its in-jokes." Michael Wilmington of the Los Angeles Times stated, "If you can tap into Hooper's oddball rhythms and cold sendups, you can enjoy yourself. And, though the 1953 'Invaders' was an effective movie, it's not really the classic that people remember. Except for Menzies' superb production designs, everything in the remake is better: the acting, the camerawork, definitely the Martians. It may not grip audiences in the same way, but that's because Hooper is trying something harder, a conscious campiness that's tough to bring off." Paul Attanasio of The Washington Post wrote that "despite its occasional sparkle, 'Invaders From Mars' is an overlong movie with a tiny spirit. It plays to a certain smug superiority of an audience nurtured on junky television, and while that smugness is in some ways justified—movies like the original 'Invaders From Mars' had their obvious failings—it's also, over the course of a feature film, more than a little annoying." Time Out wrote, "... whereas the original worked by building up an increasingly black mood, this version relies almost entirely on the special effects; and such limited brooding tension as it has is gratuitously undermined by a string of sequences played purely for laughs". Thomas Kent Miller in his book Mars in the Movies called it "unredeemingly awful [if seen for the first time by a 21st century adult]. Otherwise, some children who saw it for the first time, with little or no knowledge of the 1953 version, derive much pleasure from the film."

As of April 2021 the film holds a 38% approval rating at film review aggregator website Rotten Tomatoes based on 16 reviews.

It was nominated for two awards at the 7th Golden Raspberry Awards, including Worst Supporting Actress for Louise Fletcher and Worst Visual Effects.

Novelization 
A novelization of Invaders from Mars, by horror novelist Ray Garton, was published by Pocket Books in the United States and Grafton Books in the United Kingdom.

Home media 
Scream Factory (under license from MGM) released the film for the first time on Blu-ray on April 7, 2015.

See also 

 List of American films of 1986

References

External links 
 

1986 films
1980s science fiction horror films
1986 horror films
Alien invasions in films
Remakes of American films
American science fiction horror films
American science fiction war films
American dark fantasy films
1980s English-language films
Films scored by Christopher Young
Films directed by Tobe Hooper
Films set in 1986
Golan-Globus films
Horror film remakes
Mars in film
Films about the United States Marine Corps
Films shot in Los Angeles
Films with screenplays by Dan O'Bannon
Films produced by Menahem Golan
Films produced by Yoram Globus
1980s American films